Six-wheel drive (6WD or 6×6) is an all-wheel drive drivetrain configuration of three axles with at least two wheels on each axle capable of being driven simultaneously by the vehicle's engine. Unlike four-wheel drive drivetrains, the configuration is largely confined to heavy-duty off-road and military vehicles, such as all-terrain vehicles, armored vehicles, and prime movers.

When such a vehicle only has six wheels by definition all are driven.  When it has ten – with two pairs of ganged "dual" wheels on each rear axle as on a GMC CCKW – all are also driven but the 6×6 designation remains. For most military applications where traction/mobility are considered more important than payload capability, single wheels on each axle (often referred to as super singles) are the norm.

Heavy hauler and ballast tractor 6×6s have had a long history as prime movers both in the military (as tank transports and artillery tractors), and commercially in logging and heavy equipment hauling both on- and off-road.

Most six-wheel drive vehicles have a forward axle and two at the rear (with only the front pair steering), or three evenly spaced in varying steering configurations. Depending on the vehicle's role, the number of wheels varies between six (in three pairs) and ten (with two in the front and two dual axles with four wheels apiece in the rear). Drive may be limited to the rear two axles for on-road use.

Examples
Military
 British Alvis FV600 series: Saladin, Saracen, Salamander and Stalwart 
 Finland Sisu SA-240 & SA-241
 French Renault TRM 10000
 French ACMAT VLRA
 German Mercedes-Benz G300 CDI G-Class 6x6
 German MAN/RMMV SX44 
 German MAN LX and FX
 German RMMV HX58, HX61 & HX42M
 Austrian Pinzgauer High Mobility All-Terrain Vehicle 
 Italian Astra Veicoli Industriali tactical range SM66.40
 Poland Star 266
 Serbian FAP 2026
 U.S. M25 tank transporter
 U.S. Mack NO heavy cargo truck
 U.S. CCKW  ton medium cargo truck
 U.S. M35  ton medium cargo truck
 U.S. M561 Gama Goat
 U.S. M939 heavy cargo truck
 U.S. MTVR all-terrain cargo truck
 U.S. FMTV MTV
 U.S. M123/123A, M125/125A prime mover/heavy cargo truck
 Indian Ashok Leyland FAT 6×6 cargo truck

Military/commercial
 Canada Western Star Trucks
 Czech Tatra T815
 German Mercedes-Benz Actros
 German Mercedes-Benz Zetros
 Russian Ural-4320
 Russian ZIL-131
 Ukrainian KrAZ-255
 U.S. Oshkosh M911 (also produced as 8x6 with a liftable second axle)

Commercial
 Commercial 6×6 prime movers were made by Hayes Manufacturing and Pacific Trucks. which also produced heavy haul ballast tractors.  The Freightliner Business Class M2 is a commercial medium-duty truck sold in the United States and available in a 6×6 configuration.

Conversions
 Six-by-six conversions of four-wheel drive trucks are made, such as the Australian Army's Perentie Land Rover Defender and "Landcruiser Sherman"), as are 6×4 versions (with only front and rear or front and middle axles driven).

Recreational ATV/UTV
 Polaris Industries has produced a number of six-wheel drive ATVs and UTVs for many years, based on a standard Magnum, Sportsman or Ranger with an extra axle and a cargo box over the rear wheels.

Concept cars

Concept car, testbed, and limited production commercial examples include:

 Hennessey Ford VelociRaptor 6×6, with a 30-inch extended frame and six driven wheels.
 6x6 Six Wheel Drive Jeep. Fully custom chassis, body and drive-line.

Twin front axle
 Ford Seattle-ite XXI (concept car)
 Tyrrell P34

Twin rear axle
 Bogie-drive (Twin axle) 6x6 vehicles are built by 6x6 Australia Pty Ltd and have full load-sharing coil-spring rear suspension with full-time bogie-drive 
(Twin axle) drive in the rear, and an integrated "roll steer" function built into the suspension design. All 6x6 Australia Pty Ltd vehicles are ADR-compliant with IPA for both "heavy" and "light" vehicles.
 Dodge T-Rex
 Mercedes-Benz G63 AMG 6x6 4x4 plus two without load-share, meaning far less wheel articulation for off-road, needing five differential locks to  operate

Gallery

See also 
 Four-wheel drive
 6x4 (drivetrain)
 H-drive
 Driveline windup
 Eight-wheel drive

Notes 

 
Car layouts
Six-wheeled vehicles
All-wheel-drive vehicles